Thomas Kinsella (4 May 192822 December 2021) was an Irish poet, translator, editor, and publisher. Born outside Dublin, Kinsella attended University College Dublin before entering the civil service. He began publishing poetry in the early 1950s and, around the same time, translated early Irish poetry into English. In the 1960s, he moved to the United States to teach English at universities including Temple University. Kinsella continued to publish steadily until the 2010s.

Early life and work
Thomas Kinsella was born on 4 May 1928 in Inchicore to Agnes (Casserly) and John Kinsella. He spent most of his childhood in the Kilmainham/Inchicore area of Dublin. He was educated at the Model School, Inchicore, where classes were taught in the Irish language, and at the O'Connell Schools in North Richmond Street, Dublin. His father and grandfather both worked in Guinness's brewery. He entered University College Dublin in 1946, initially to study science. After a few terms in college, he took a post in the Irish civil service in the department of finance and continued his university studies at night, having switched to humanities and arts.

Many of Kinsella's early poems were published in the University College Dublin magazine National Student from 1951 to 1953. His first pamphlet, The Starlit Eye (1952), was published by Liam Miller's Dolmen Press, as was Poems (1956), his first book-length publication. These were followed by Another September (1958–1962), Moralities (1960), Downstream (1962), Wormwood (1966), and the long poem Nightwalker (1967).

Translations and editing
At Miller's suggestion, Kinsella turned his attention to the translation of early Irish texts. He produced versions of Longes Mac Usnig and The Breastplate of St Patrick in 1954 and of Thirty-Three Triads in 1955. His most significant work in this area was collected in two volumes. The first of these was The Táin (Dolmen, 1969; Oxford University Press, 1970), a version of the Táin Bó Cúailnge illustrated by Louis le Brocquy.

With Seán Ó Tuama, Kinsella co-edited An Duanaire: 1600–1900, Poems of the Dispossessed (1981), an anthology of Irish poems that critic Siobhán Holland describes as a "politicized deployment of the anthology genre". An Duanaire won a "special award" of the Rooney Prize for Irish Literature in 1982. He also edited Austin Clarke's Selected Poems and Collected Poems (both 1974) for Dolmen and The New Oxford Book of Irish Verse (1986).

According to critic Dillon Johnston, Kinsella's translations of Táin and An Duanaire have helped to "revitalize" the Irish literary canon.

Later poetry
In 1965, Kinsella left the civil service to teach at Southern Illinois University, and in 1970 he became a professor of English at Temple University. In 1973, he started Temple's Irish studies programme.

In 1972, he started Peppercanister Press to publish his own work. The first Peppercanister production was Butcher's Dozen, a satirical response to the Widgery Tribunal into the events of Bloody Sunday. This poem drew on the aisling tradition.

Beginning around 1968 with Nightwalker and Other Poems, Kinsella's work became more influenced by American modernist poetry, particularly the poetry of Ezra Pound, William Carlos Williams, and Robert Lowell. In addition, his poetry started to focus more on the individual psyche as seen through the work of Carl Jung. These tendencies appeared in the poems of Notes from the Land of the Dead (1973) and One (1974).

According to critic Thomas H. Jackson, books including Her Vertical Smile (1985), Out of Ireland (1987), and St Catherine's Clock (1987) blended personal and world-historical perspectives: "address a self, and you find the world; address an aspect of the world, and you find a self". One Fond Embrace (1988) and Poems from Centre City (1990) allude to historical antecedents including Brian Merriman and medieval curse poetry to dissect contemporary events such as architectural development in Dublin.

Awards and honours 
Kinsella received the honorary Freedom of the City of Dublin on 24 May 2007. In December 2018, he received an honorary doctorate from Trinity College Dublin.

Personal life and death
Kinsella's brother was the composer John Kinsella (1932–2021). Thomas died in Dublin on 22 December 2021, at the age of 93. His wife Eleanor predeceased him in 2017.

Works

Poetry collections
 Poems (1956)
 Another September (Dolmen, 1958)
 Poems & Translations (New York: Atheneum, 1961)
 Downstream (1962)
 Tear (Cambridge, Massachusetts: Pym-Randall Press, 1969)
 Nightwalker and Other Poems (1968)
 The Good Fight (Peppercanister, 1973)
 Notes from the Land of the Dead and Other Poems (1973)
 Fifteen Dead (1979)
 One and Other Poems (1979)
 Peppercanister Poems 1972–1978 (Winston-Salem, North Carolina: Wake Forest University Press, 1980)
 One Fond Embrace (Deerfield, Massachusetts: Deerfield Press, 1981)
 St Catherine's Clock (Dolmen, 1987)
 Blood and Family (Oxford University Press, 1988)
 Madonna and Other Poems (Peppercanister, 1991)
 Open Court (Peppercanister, 1991)
From Centre City (1994)
 The Pen Shop (Peppercanister, 1996)
 The Familiar (Peppercanister, 1999)
 Godhead (Peppercanister, 1999)
 Citizen of the World (Peppercanister, 2000)
 Littlebody (Peppercanister, 2000)
 Collected Poems 1956–2001 (Manchester: Carcanet Press, 2001; Winston-Salem, North Carolina: Wake Forest University Press, 2006)
 Marginal Economy (Dublin: Dedalus Press; Manchester: Carcanet Press, 2006)
 Belief and Unbelief (Dublin: Dedalus Press; Manchester: Carcanet Press, 2007)
 Man of War (Dublin: Dedalus Press; Manchester: Carcanet Press, 2007)
 Selected Poems (Manchester: Carcanet Press, 2007)
 Fat Master (2011)
 Love Joy Peace (2011)

Prose collections
 The Dual Tradition (1995)
 Readings in Poetry (Dublin: Dedalus Press; Manchester: Carcanet Press, 2006)

Poetry and prose
 A Dublin Documentary (O'Brien Press, 2007)

Translation
 The Táin, translated from the Irish epic Táin Bó Cúailnge, with illustrations by Louis le Brocquy. Dolmen, 1969; Oxford University Press, 1970.
 An Duanaire - Poems of the Dispossessed, an anthology of Gaelic poems; edited by Seán Ó Tuama. Portlaoise: Dolmen Press, 1981 .

Audio
 Thomas Kinsella Poems 1956–2006 (Claddagh Records, 2007)

Citations

Sources

External links
 Thomas Kinsella papers, 1951–2016 at Stuart A. Rose Manuscript, Archives, and Rare Book Library, Emory University
 

1928 births
2021 deaths
20th-century Irish civil servants
20th-century Irish male writers
20th-century Irish-language poets
20th-century translators
21st-century Irish male writers
21st-century Irish-language poets
21st-century translators
Alumni of University College Dublin
Claddagh Records artists
Irish editors
Irish expatriates in the United States
Irish male poets
Irish modernist poets
Irish translators
People educated at O'Connell School
People from Inchicore
Southern Illinois University faculty
Táin Bó Cúailnge
Temple University faculty
Translators from Irish
Translators from Old Irish
Translators of Brian Merriman
Translators of the Táin Bó Cúailnge